Atanas Nikolov (born 21 July 1977) is a Bulgarian football manager and former player who manages Bulgarian Third League club Perun Kresna.

Club career
On 15 March 2012, Nikolov scored the second goal in the historic 2:1 victory against Bulgarian powerhouse CSKA Sofia in the quarter-finals of the Bulgarian Cup.

Nikolov previously played for Pirin 1922 and Lokomotiv Mezdra in the A PFG.

References

Bulgarian footballers
1977 births
Living people
First Professional Football League (Bulgaria) players
Second Professional Football League (Bulgaria) players
Sportspeople from Blagoevgrad
OFC Pirin Blagoevgrad players
PFC Pirin Blagoevgrad players
PFC Lokomotiv Mezdra players
PFC Minyor Pernik players
FC Septemvri Simitli players

Association football forwards